The Treaty of Corbeil (1326) renewed the Auld Alliance between France and Scotland. It confirmed the obligation of each state to join the other in declaring war if either was attacked by England. The deputation (delegation) from Scotland (then under the rule of Robert the Bruce) was led by Thomas Randolph, 1st Earl of Moray.

See also
List of treaties

References

Corbeil (1326)
1320s in France
1326 in Scotland
Corbeil (1326)
Auld Alliance
1320s treaties